The Bhupesh Baghel ministry is the Council of Ministers in 5th Chhattisgarh Legislative Assembly headed by Chief Minister Bhupesh Baghel. Currently, the ministry has 13 ministers including the Chief Minister.

Council of Ministers

References

Indian National Congress state ministries
Lists of current Indian state and territorial ministries
Cabinets established in 2018
2018 establishments in Chhattisgarh
Chhattisgarh ministries